Mesopsychidae is an extinct family of scorpionflies known from the Late Permian to Mid Cretaceous. It is part of Mesopsychoidea, a group of scorpionflies with siphonate proboscis. They are suggested to have been nectarivores, feeding off the liquid pollination drops and acting as pollinators for now extinct insect pollinated gymnosperms such as Bennettitales.

Systematics 
Afristella Riek 1974 Molteno Formation, South Africa, Late Triassic (Carnian)
Allochorista Hong 2007 Tongchuan Formation, China, Middle Triassic (Ladinian)
Baissopsyche Novokshonov and Sukacheva 2001 Sharin-Gol Formation, Mongolia, Early Cretaceous (Barremian), Zaza Formation, Russia, Early Cretaceous (Aptian)
Epicharmesopsyche Shih et al. 2013 Daohugou, China, Middle Jurassic (Callovian)
Ferghanopsyche Martynov 1937 Sulyukta Formation, Kyrgyzstan, Early Jurassic (Toarcian)
Lichnomesopsyche Ren et al. 2009 Daohugou, China, Callovian
Mesopanorpodes Ren et al. 2009 Vokhma Formation, Russia, Late Permian (Changhsingian), Ashfield Shale, Australia, Middle Triassic (Anisian), Tongchuan Formation, China, Ladinian
Mesopsyche Tillyard 1917 (Possibly paraphyletic) Vyazniki Formation, Mal'tseva Formation, Russia, Changhsingian, Blackstone Formation, Australia, Late Triassic (Norian), Tongchuan Formation, China, Ladinian, Madygen Formation, Kyrgyzstan, Carnian, Amisan Formation, South Korea, Norian, Protopivka Formation, Ukraine, Norian
Mesoses Riek 1976 Gayndah Formation, Australia, Anisian, Molteno Formation, South Africa, Carnian
Permopsyche Bashkuev 2011 Croudace Bay Formation, Australia, Changhsingian, Poldarsa Formation, Russia, Late Permian (Wuchiapingian)
Ptychopteropsis Martynov 1937 Sulyukta Formation, Kyrgyzstan, Toarcian
Sogdopsyche Martynov 1937 Jiulongshan Formation, China, Callovian Sulyukta Formation, Kyrgyzstan, Toarcian
Tarantogus Sukatsheva 1985 Itat Formation, Russia, Middle Jurassic (Bajocian-Bathonian)
Tipulidites Wieland 1925 Potrerillos Formation, Argentina, Carnian
Turanopsyche Martynov 1937 Sulyukta Formation, Kyrgyzstan, Toarcian
Undisca Sukacheva 1990 Glushkovo Formation, Late Jurassic (Tithonian)
Vitimopsyche Novokshonov and Sukacheva 2001 Daohugou, China, Callovian, Yixian Formation, China, Aptian Zaza Formation, Russia, Aptian
Xinjiangia Hong 1983 Kezileinuer Formation, Xinjiang, China, Bajocian

References 

Mecoptera
Prehistoric insect families
Permian first appearances